Norway Chess is an annual closed chess tournament, typically taking place in the May to June time period every year. The first edition took place in the Stavanger area, Norway, from 7 May to 18 May 2013. The 2013 tournament had ten participants, including seven of the ten highest rated players in the world per the May 2013 FIDE World Rankings. It was won by Sergey Karjakin, with Magnus Carlsen and Hikaru Nakamura tied for second place. Norway Chess 2015 took place in mid-June 2015 and was a part of the inaugural Grand Chess Tour. The tournament has since decided to withdraw from the Grand Chess Tour.

Winners

{| class="sortable wikitable"
! # !! Year !! Winner (classical) !! Winner (blitz)
|-
| style="text-align:center;"|1||2013||||
|-
| style="text-align:center;"|2||2014||||
|-
| style="text-align:center;"|3||2015|||| 
|-
| style="text-align:center;"|4||2016||||
|-
| style="text-align:center;"|5||2017||||
|-
| style="text-align:center;"|6||2018||||
|-
| style="text-align:center;"|7||2019||||
|-
| style="text-align:center;"|8||2020||||–
|-
| style="text-align:center;"|9||2021||||–
|-
| style="text-align:center;"|10||2022||||
|}

2013 
The 2013 tournament started with a blitz round played at the University of Stavanger on 7 May 2013. Rounds 1–8 were played at Hotel Residence, Sandnes (rounds 1–3, 5–6, 8), at Aarbakke factory in Bryne (round 4) and on the island Sør-Hidle in Strand (round 7). The final round 9 was played in Stavanger Concert Hall on 18 May 2013. In addition to the super tournament, there was a local school tournament and a celebrity tournament. Partly parallel to the tournament, Stavanger Open NGP 2013 was arranged by Stavanger Chess Club from 8 to 12 May. Games were streamed live with Dirk Jan ten Geuzendam and Simen Agdestein as commentators.

The tournament was arranged by the foundation Norway Chess, with economic support from local businesses and municipalities and the Rogaland county. The cost of the arrangement was predicted to be about 5 million Norwegian kroner (approximately 672,000 euro), of which about half is for the prizes for the participants. The organizers plan to make the tournament a yearly event.

Vladimir Kramnik was originally among the expected participants, but in April 2013 it was announced that he had withdrawn and was replaced with Peter Svidler.

Blitz tournament
On 7 May 2013, a blitz tournament was played to decide the play order for the main tournament. According to regulations, the winner of the blitz tournament had the right to choose the number in the table by his own, and Sergey Karjakin chose to be fifth in the main tournament table.

{| class="wikitable" style="text-align:center;"
|+1st Supreme Masters Blitz, 7 May 2013, Sandnes, Rogaland county, Norway
!  !! Player !! Blitz rating !! 1 !! 2 !! 3 !! 4 !! 5 !! 6 !! 7 !! 8 !! 9 !! 10 !! Points !!  !!  !! SB
|-
| 1 || align=left |  || 2873
|  || 1 || 0 || 1 || 0 || 1 || 1 || 1 || ½ || 1 || 6½ || || ||
|-
| 2 || align=left |  || 2856
| 0 ||  || ½ || 1 || 1 || 0 || 1 || ½ || 1 || 1 || 6 || 5 || ||
|-
| 3 || align=left |  || 
| 1 || ½ ||  || 0 || 1 || 1 || 0 || 1 || 1 || ½ || 6 || 4 || 2 || 26.00
|-
| 4 || align=left |  || 2844
| 0 || 0 || 1 ||  || ½ || ½ || 1 || 1 || 1 || 1 || 6 || 4 || 1 || 21.25
|-
| 5 || align=left |  || 2757
| 1 || 0 || 0 || ½ ||  || 1 || 1 || 0 || 1 || 1 || 5½ || || ||
|-
| 6 || align=left |  || 2755
| 0 || 1 || 0 || ½ || 0 ||  || ½ || 1 || 1 || 1 || 5 || || ||
|-
| 7 || align=left |  || 
| 0 || 0 || 1 || 0 || 0 || ½ ||  || 1 || ½ || ½ || 3½ || || ||
|-
| 8 || align=left |  || 2698
| 0 || ½ || 0 || 0 || 1 || 0 || 0 ||  || ½ || 1 || 3 || || ||
|-
| 9 || align=left |  || 2817
| ½ || 0 || 0 || 0 || 0 || 0 || ½ || ½ ||  || 1 || 2½ || || ||
|-
| 10 || align=left |  || 2666
| 0 || 0 || ½ || 0 || 0 || 0 || 0 || ½ || 0 ||  || 1 || || ||
|}

Second, third and fourth place were decided by tiebreakers: Carlsen on most games with black pieces; Anand with two victories with black against Nakamura's one victory.

Classical tournament
{| class="wikitable" style="text-align:center;"
|+1st Supreme Masters, 8–18 May 2013, Sandnes – Bryne – Sør-Hidle – Stavanger, Norway, Cat. XXI (2766)
! !! Player !! Rating !! 1 !! 2 !! 3 !! 4 !! 5 !! 6 !! 7 !! 8 !! 9 !! 10 !! Points !! SB !! TPR
|- style="background:#cfc;"
| 1 || align=left | || 2767
|   || 0 || 1 || 0 || 1 || ½ || 1 || ½ || 1 || 1 || 6 || || 2891
|-
| 2 || align=left |  || 2868
| 1 ||  || ½ || ½ || ½ || ½ || 0 || ½ || 1 || 1 || 5½ || 22.75 || 2835
|-
| 3 || align=left |  || 2775
| 0 || ½ ||  || ½ || 0 || 1 || 1 || ½ || 1 || 1 || 5½ || 21.25 || 2845
|-
| 4 || align=left |  || 2769
| 1 || ½ || ½ ||  || ½ || ½ || 0 || ½ || ½ || 1 || 5 || 21.50 || 2809
|-
| 5 || align=left |  || 2813
| 0 || ½ || 1 || ½ ||  || ½ || ½ || ½ || ½ || 1 || 5 || 20.50 || 2804
|-
| 6 || align=left |  || 2783
| ½ || ½ || 0 || ½ || ½ ||  || 0 || 1 || 1 || 1 || 5 || 19.25 || 2807
|-
| 7 || align=left |  || 2743
| 0 || 1 || 0 || 1 || ½ || 1 ||  || ½ || ½ || 0 || 4½ || || 2769
|-
| 8 || align=left |  || 2793
| ½ || ½ || ½ || ½ || ½ || 0 || ½ ||  || ½ || ½ || 4 || || 2720
|-
| 9 || align=left |  || 2745
| 0 || 0 || 0 || ½ || ½ || 0 || ½ || ½ ||   || 1 || 3 || || 2643
|-
| 10 || align=left |  || 2608
| 0 || 0 || 0 || 0 || 0 || 0 || 1 || ½ || 0 ||  || 1½ || || 2511
|}

The tiebreakers were: Sonneborn-Berger score, most wins, most wins with black. In case of a tie for the first place, a two-game blitz match (or blitz tournament) and an armageddon game were scheduled.

2014 
The second edition took place from 2 to 13 June 2014. The ten participants were Magnus Carlsen, Levon Aronian, Vladimir Kramnik, Veselin Topalov, Fabiano Caruana, Alexander Grischuk, Sergey Karjakin, Peter Svidler, Anish Giri and Simen Agdestein. Agdestein qualified by defeating Jon Ludvig Hammer in a rapid match that took place from 26 to 27 April 2014.

Blitz tournament 
On 2 June 2014, a blitz tournament was played to decide the play order for the main tournament.
{| class="wikitable" style="text-align:center;"
|+2nd Norway Chess Blitz, 2 June 2014, Flor og Fjære, Sør-Hidle, Norway
!  !! Player !! Blitz rating !! 1 !! 2 !! 3 !! 4 !! 5 !! 6 !! 7 !! 8 !! 9 !! 10 !! Points !!  !! 
|-
| 1 || align=left |  || 2837
|  || ½ || 1 || ½ || 1 || 1 || ½ || 1 || 1 || 1 || 7½ || ||
|-
| 2 || align=left |  || 2863
| ½ ||  || 0 || ½ || 1 || 1 || 1 || ½ || 1 || 1 || 6½ || ||
|-
| 3 || align=left | || 2866
| 0 || 1 ||  || 0 || ½ || 0 || 1 || 1 || 1 || 1 || 5½ || 5 ||
|-
| 4 || align=left |  || 2801
| ½ || ½ || 1 ||  || ½ || 0 || 1 || 1 || ½ || ½ || 5½ || 4 ||
|-
| 5 || align=left |  || 2757
| 0 || 0 || ½ || ½ ||  || 1 || 0 || 1 || 1 || 1 || 5 || ||
|-
| 6 || align=left |  || 2755
| 0 || 0 || 1 || 1 || 0 ||  || 1 || 0 || ½ || 1 || 4½ || ||
|-
| 7 || align=left |  || 2782
| ½ || 0 || 0 || 0 || 1 || 0 ||  || ½ || ½ || 1 || 3½ || 5 || 1
|-
| 8 || align=left |  || 2697
| 0 || ½ || 0 || 0 || 0 || 1 || ½ ||  || ½ || 1 || 3½ || 5 || 0
|-
| 9 || align=left |  || 2666
| 0 || 0 || 0 || ½ || 0 || ½ || ½ || ½ ||  || 0 || 2 || ||
|-
| 10 || align=left |  || 2577
| 0 || 0 || 0 || ½ || 0 || 0 || 0 || 0 || 1 ||  || 1½ || ||
|}
The places 3, 4, 7 and 8 were decided by tiebreakers: Karjakin on most games with black pieces, Kramnik with one victory with black against Caruana's zero victory.

Classical tournament
{| class="wikitable" style="text-align:center;"
|+2nd Unibet Norway Chess, 3–14 June 2014, Stavanger, Norway, Category XXI (2774)
! !! Player !! Rating !! 1 !! 2 !! 3 !! 4 !! 5 !! 6 !! 7 !! 8 !! 9 !! 10 !! Points || SB !! Wins !! TPR
|- style="background:#cfc;"
| 1 || align=left | || 2771
|   || ½ || 1 || 1 || ½ || 0 || ½ || 1 || 1 || ½ || 6 || || || 2899
|-
| 2 || align=left |  || 2881
| ½ ||  || ½ || ½ || ½ || 1|| ½ || ½ || ½ || 1 || 5½ || || || 2841
|-
| 3 || align=left |  || 2792
| 0 || ½ ||  || 0 || 1 || 1 || ½ || ½ || 1 || ½ || 5 || || || 2814
|-
| 4 || align=left |  || 2791
| 0 || ½ || 1 ||  || ½ || ½ || 1 || ½ || 0 || ½ || 4½ || 19.75 || || 2771
|-
| 5 || align=left |  || 2772
| ½ || ½ || 0 || ½ ||  || ½ || ½ || 0 || 1 || 1 || 4½|| 19.50 || || 2774
|-
| 6 || align=left |  || 2815
| 1 || 0 || 0 || ½ || ½ ||  || ½ || ½ || ½ || ½ || 4 || 18.25 || 1 || 2726
|-
| 7 || align=left |  || 2753
| ½ || ½ || ½ || 0 || ½ || ½ ||  || ½ || ½ || ½ || 4 || 18.25 || 0 || 2733
|-
| 8 || align=left |  || 2752
| 0 || ½ || ½ || ½ || 1 || ½ || ½ ||  || 0 || ½ || 4 || 17.75 || || 2733
|-
| 9 || align=left |  || 2783
| 0 || ½ || 0 || 1 || 0 || ½ || ½ || 1 ||  || ½ || 4 || 17.00 || || 2729
|-
| 10 || align=left |  || 2628
| ½ || 0 || ½ || ½ || 0 || ½ || ½ || ½ || ½ ||  || 3½ || || || 2710
|}

The tiebreakers were: Sonneborn-Berger score, most wins, most wins with black. In case of a tie for the first place, a two-game blitz match (or blitz tournament) and an armageddon game were scheduled.

2015 
The third edition of the tournament took place from 15 to 26 June 2015. This was the first tournament of a three tournament series in the inaugural Grand Chess Tour, where participants accumulate as many points as possible over the three tournaments for prizes in the overall tour. The players were Magnus Carlsen, Viswanathan Anand, Levon Aronian, Veselin Topalov, Hikaru Nakamura, Fabiano Caruana, Alexander Grischuk, Anish Giri, Maxime Vachier-Lagrave, and Jon Ludvig Hammer. Jon Ludvig Hammer was not invited to the overall Grand Chess Tour; however, he qualified for the 10th spot in the tournament by winning the Enter Card Scandinavian Masters Tournament in May 2015.

Blitz tournament
On 15 June 2015, a blitz tournament was played to decide the play order for the main tournament. It was won by Maxime Vachier-Lagrave of France.

{| class="wikitable" style="text-align:center;"
|+3rd Norway Chess Blitz, 15 June 2015, Stavanger, Norway
!  !! Player !! Blitz rating !! 1 !! 2 !! 3 !! 4 !! 5 !! 6 !! 7 !! 8 !! 9 !! 10 !! Points !!  !!  !! 
|-
| 1 || align=left | || 2826
|  || 0 || ½ || 1 || ½ || 1 || ½ || 1 || 1 || 1 || 6½ || || ||
|-
| 2 || align=left |  || 2883
| 1 ||  || ½ || 0 || ½ || 1 || 0 || 1 || 1 || 1 || 6 || || ||
|-
| 3 || align=left |  || 2767
| ½ || ½ ||  || 0 || 0 || 1 || 1 || ½ || 1 || 1 || 5½ || 5 || 4 || 3
|-
| 4 || align=left |  || 2933
| 0 || 1 || 1 ||  || ½ || ½ || 0 || 1 || ½ || 1 || 5½ || 5 || 4 || 2
|-
| 5 || align=left |  || 2771
| ½ || ½ || 1 || ½ ||  || 0 || ½ || ½ || 1 || 1 || 5½ || 4 || ||
|-
| 6 || align=left |  || 2816
| 0 || 0 || 0 || ½ || 1 ||  || ½ || 1 || 1 || 1 || 5 || || ||
|-
| 7 || align=left |  || 2839
| ½ || 1 || 0 || 1 || ½ || ½ ||  || 0 || 0 || ½ || 4 || || ||
|-
| 8 || align=left |  || 2641
| 0 || 0 || ½ || 0 || ½ || 0 || 1 ||  || 0 || 1 || 3 || || ||
|-
| 9 || align=left |  || 2679
| 0 || 0 || 0 || ½ || 0 || 0 || 1 || 1 ||  || 0 || 2½ || || ||
|-
| 10 || align=left |  || 2648
| 0 || 0 || 0 || 0 || 0 || 0 || ½ || 0 || 1 ||  || 1½ || || ||
|}

Classical tournament 
{| class="wikitable" style="text-align:center;"
|+3rd Norway Chess, 16–25 June 2015, Stavanger, Norway, Category XXII (2782)
!  !! Player !! Rating !! 1 !! 2 !! 3 !! 4 !! 5 !! 6 !! 7 !! 8 !! 9 !! 10 !! Points !!  !!  !! SB !! TPR
|- style="background:#cfc;"
| 1 || align=left | || 2798
|   || ½ || ½ || 0 || ½ || 1 || 1 || 1 || 1 || 1 || 6½ || || || || 2946
|-
| 2 || align=left |  || 2804
| ½ ||  || ½ || ½ || ½ || 1 || 1 || ½ || ½ || 1 || 6 || 3 || ½ || 24.75 || 2904
|-
| 3 || align=left |  || 2802
| ½ || ½ ||  || ½ || 1 || ½ || ½ || ½ || 1 || 1 || 6 || 3 || ½ || 24.50 || 2904
|-
| 4 || align=left |  || 2773
| 1 || ½ || ½ ||  || ½ || ½ || ½ || 1 || ½ || ½ || 5½ || || || || 2862
|-
| 5 || align=left |  || 2805
| ½ || ½ || 0 || ½ ||  || ½ || 1 || ½ || 0 || ½ || 4 || 1 || ½ || 17.75 || 2736
|-
| 6 || align=left |  || 2723
| 0 || 0 || ½ || ½ || ½ ||  || ½ || ½ || 1 || ½ || 4 || 1 || ½ || 15.75 || 2745
|-
| 7 || align=left |  || 2876
| 0 || 0 || ½ || ½ || 0 || ½ ||  || 1 || 1 || 0 || 3½ || 2 || || || 2691
|-
| 8 || align=left |  || 2781
| 0 || ½ || ½ || 0 || ½ || ½ || 0 ||  || ½ || 1 || 3½ || 1 || || || 2702
|-
| 9 || align=left |  || 2780
| 0 || ½ || 0 || ½ || 1 || 0 || 0 || ½ ||  || ½ || 3 || 1 || ½ || 13.00 || 2657
|-
| 10 || align=left |  || 2677
| 0 || 0 || 0 || ½ || ½ || ½ || 1 || 0 || ½ ||  || 3 || 1 || ½ || 11.75 || 2668
|}

The tiebreakers were: most wins, direct encounter, Sonneborn-Berger system, extended Koya system.

2016 

The fourth Norway Chess Tournament took place from 18 to 30 April 2016 with a new title sponsor, Altibox. The tournament withdrew from the Grand Chess Tour in early January 2016 citing differences on the future of chess supertournaments and tournament sponsorship.

The players were initially announced as Magnus Carlsen, Vladimir Kramnik, Anish Giri, Levon Aronian, Maxime Vachier-Lagrave, Veselin Topalov, Sergey Karjakin, Pavel Eljanov, Pentala Harikrishna, and a wildcard to be determined in a qualifying tournament.

On 6 April, Karjakin decided not to play in the tournament. His spot was taken by Li Chao.

Wild card qualifier

A qualifying tournament took place from 23 to 26 March 2016. It was a double round robin consisting of two stages: the first leg was played with a classical time control and 3–1–0 scoring system; the second leg was played with a rapid time control and 2–1–0 scoring system. It was won by Nils Grandelius.

{| class="wikitable" style="text-align:center"
|+ First leg
! !! Player !! Rating !! 1 !! 2 !! 3 !! 4 !! Points 
|-
| 1 || align=left | || 2646
|  || 3 || 1 || 3 || 7
|-
| 2 || align=left |  || 2701
| 0 ||  || 3 || 3 || 6
|-
| 3 || align=left |  || 2667
| 1 || 0 ||  || 1 || 2
|-
| 4 || align=left |  || 2553
| 0 || 0 || 1 ||  || 1
|}

{| class="wikitable" style="text-align:center"
|+ Second leg
! !! Player !! Rapid rating !! 1 !! 2 !! 3 !! 4 !! Points 
|-
| 1 || align=left | || 2598
|  || 2 || 2 || 1 || 5
|-
| 2 || align=left |  || 2625
| 0 ||  || 2 || 2 || 4
|-
| 3 || align=left |  || 2620
| 0 || 0 ||  || 2 || 2
|-
| 4 || align=left |  || 2532
| 1 || 0 || 0 ||  || 1
|}

{| class="wikitable" style="text-align:center"
|+ Final scores
! !! Player !! Rating !! First leg !! Second leg !! Total score 
|-
| 1 || align=left | || 2646
| 7 || 5 || 12
|-
| 2 || align=left |  || 2701
| 6 || 2 || 8
|-
| 3 || align=left |  || 2667
| 2 || 4 || 6
|-
| 4 || align=left |  || 2553
| 1 || 1 || 2
|}

Blitz tournament 

On 18 April 2016, a blitz tournament was conducted to determine the pairings in the tournament. The top 5 finishers in the blitz tournament earned an extra white game in the tournament.

The following is the final crosstable of the event (obtained from chess.com). Magnus Carlsen, Anish Giri, Maxime Vachier-Lagrave, Vladimir Kramnik, and Levon Aronian finished in the top 5 and, thus, earned their extra white game.

{| class="wikitable" style="text-align:center;"
|+4th Altibox Norway Chess Blitz, 18 April 2016, Stavanger, Norway
!  !! Player !! Blitz rating !! 1 !! 2 !! 3 !! 4 !! 5 !! 6 !! 7 !! 8 !! 9 !! 10 !! Points !! SB !! TPR
|-
| 1 || align=left | || 2890
|  || 0 || 1 || 1 || 1 || 1 || 1 || ½ || 1 || 1 || 7½ || || 3040
|-
| 2 || align=left |  || 2793
| 1 ||  || 0 || ½ || ½ || 1 || ½ || 1 || 1 || 1 || 6½ || || 2933
|-
| 3 || align=left |  || 2872
| 0 || 1 ||  || ½ || ½ || 1 || 0 || 1 || 1 || 1 || 6 || 23.25 || 2888 
|-
| 4 || align=left |  || 2817
| 0 || ½ || ½ ||  || ½ || 1 || 1 || ½ || 1 || 1 || 6 || 21.75 || 2886
|-
| 5 || align=left |  || 2814
| 0 || ½ || ½ || ½ ||  || 1 || ½ || ½ || ½ || ½ || 4½ || || 2769
|-
| 6 || align=left |  || 2774
| 0 || 0 || 0 || 0 || 0 ||  || 1 || 1 || 1 || 1 || 4 || || 2733
|-
| 7 || align=left |  || 2647
| 0 || ½ || 1 || 0 || ½ || 0 ||  || ½ || 0 || ½ || 3 || || 2652
|-
| 8 || align=left |  || 2604
| ½ || 0 || 0 || ½ || ½ || 0 || ½ ||  || ½ || 0 || 2½ || 11.75 || 2618 
|-
| 9 || align=left |  || 2633
| 0 || 0 || 0 || 0 || ½ || 0 || 1 || ½ ||  || ½ || 2½ || 7.75 || 2606
|-
| 10 || align=left |  || 2679
| 0 || 0 || 0 || 0 || ½ || 0 || ½ || 1 || ½ ||  || 2½ || 7.50 || 2605
|}

Classical tournament 
{| class="wikitable" style="text-align:center;"
|+4th Altibox Norway Chess, 19–30 April 2016, Stavanger, Norway, Category XXI (2770)
!  !! Player !! Rating !! 1 !! 2 !! 3 !! 4 !! 5 !! 6 !! 7 !! 8 !! 9 !! 10 !! Points !! SB !! TPR
|- style="background:#cfc;"
| 1 || align=left | || 2851
|   || 0 || ½ || ½ || 1 || ½ || 1 || ½ || 1 || 1 || 6 || || 2886
|-
| 2 || align=left |  || 2784
| 1 ||  || ½ || ½ || ½ || ½ || ½ || ½ || 1 || ½ || 5½ || || 2848
|-
| 3 || align=left |  || 2788
| ½ || ½ ||  || ½ || ½ || ½ || ½ || 1 || ½ || ½ || 5 || 22.00 || 2811
|-
| 4 || align=left |  || 2754
| ½ || ½ || ½ ||  || ½ || ½ || ½ || ½ || ½ || 1 || 5 || 21.25 || 2814
|-
| 5 || align=left |  || 2801
| 0 || ½ || ½ || ½ ||  || ½ || 1 || ½ || ½ || 1 || 5 || 20.25 || 2809
|-
| 6 || align=left |  || 2755
| ½ || ½ || ½ || ½ || ½ ||  || 0 || ½ || 1 || ½ || 4½ || 19.50 || 2771
|-
| 7 || align=left |  || 2763
| 0 || ½ || ½ || ½ || 0 || 1 ||  || 1 || ½ || ½ || 4½ || 19.00 || 2770
|-
| 8 || align=left |  || 2790
| ½ || ½ || 0 || ½ || ½ || ½ || 0 ||  || 1 || ½ || 4 || || 2724
|-
| 9 || align=left |  || 2765
| 0 || 0 || ½ || ½ || ½ || 0 || ½ || 0 ||  || 1 || 3 || || 2645
|-
| 10 || align=left |  || 2649
| 0 || ½ || ½ || 0 || 0 || ½ || ½ || ½ || 0 ||  || 2½ || || 2617
|}

2017 
The fifth Norway Chess tournament was held between 6–16 June 2017. The tournament involved all ten of the world's best players by rating (at the time of announcement) and had an average Elo rating of 2797. As a result, it was billed as the strongest chess tournament in history by Altibox, its sponsor. However, by the time the tournament was held two players had dropped out of the top ten (Karjakin and Giri; their replacements Mamedyarov and Ding Liren did not play). It is also not the tournament with the highest-ever rating average; the 2014 Zurich Chess Challenge and the 2014 Sinquefield Cup had average ratings of 2801 and 2802, respectively.

Blitz tournament 

On 5 June 2017, a Blitz tournament was conducted to determine the pairings in the tournament. The top 5 finishers in the blitz tournament earned an extra white game in the tournament. Magnus Carlsen, Hikaru Nakamura, Levon Aronian, Maxime Vachier-Lagrave and Vladimir Kramnik finished in the top 5 and earned their extra white game.

{| class="wikitable" style="text-align:center;"
|+5th Altibox Norway Chess Blitz, 5 June 2017, Stavanger, Norway
!  !! Player !! Blitz rating !! 1 !! 2 !! 3 !! 4 !! 5 !! 6 !! 7 !! 8 !! 9 !! 10 !! Points !! SB !! TPR
|-
| 1 || align=left |  || 2914
|  || ½ || 1 || 1 || ½ || 1 || ½ || 1 || 1 || 1 || 7½ || || 3066
|-
| 2 || align=left |  || 2865
| ½ ||  || ½ || ½ || ½ || 0 || ½ || 1 || 1 || 1 || 5½ || || 2879
|-
| 3 || align=left |  || 2753
| 0 || ½ ||  || ½ || ½ || 1 || ½ || 1 || ½ || 1 || 5½ || || 2878 
|-
| 4 || align=left |  || 2825
| 0 || ½ || ½ ||  || 1 || 0 || 1 || 1 || 0 || 1 || 5 || || 2840
|-
| 5 || align=left |  || 2744
| ½ || ½ || ½ || 0 ||  || 1 || 1 || ½ || 0 || ½ || 4½ || 20.50 || 2796
|-
| 6 || align=left |  || 2791
| 0 || 1 || 0 || 1 || 0 ||  || ½ || 0 || 1 || 1 || 4½ || 17.00 || 2799
|-
| 7 || align=left |  || 2766
| ½ || ½ || ½ || 0 || 0 || ½ ||  || ½ || 1 || ½ || 4 || 17.25 || 2755
|-
| 8 || align=left |  || 2791
| 0 || 0 || 0 || 0 || ½ || 1 || ½ ||  || 1 || 1 || 4 || 13.25 || 2753 
|-
| 9 || align=left |  || 2800
| 0 || 0 || ½ || 1 || 1 || 0 || 0 || 0 ||  || ½ || 3 || || 2606
|-
| 10 || align=left |  || 2776
| 0 || 0 || 0 || 0 || ½ || 0 || ½ || 0 || ½ ||  || 1½ || || 2527
|}

Classical tournament 
{| class="wikitable" style="text-align:center;"
|+5th Altibox Norway Chess, 6–17 June 2017, Stavanger, Norway, Category XXII (2797)
!  !! Player !! Rating !! 1 !! 2 !! 3 !! 4 !! 5 !! 6 !! 7 !! 8 !! 9 !! 10 !! Points !! SB !! TPR
|- style="background:#cfc;"
| 1 || align=left | || 2793
|   || ½ || 1 || ½ || ½ || ½ || ½ || ½ || 1 || 1 || 6 || || 2918
|-
| 2 || align=left |  || 2785
| ½ ||  || ½ || 0 || ½ || 1 || 1 || ½ || ½ || ½ || 5 || 22.00 || 2837
|-
| 3 || align=left |  || 2808
| 0 || ½ ||  || ½ || ½ || 1 || 0 || 1 || 1 || ½ || 5 || 21.25 || 2834
|-
| 4 || align=left |  || 2808
| ½ || 1 || ½ ||  || ½ || ½ || ½ || 0 || ½ || ½ || 4½ || 20.75 || 2796
|-
| 5 || align=left |  || 2812
| ½ || ½ || ½ || ½ ||  || ½ || ½|| ½ || ½ || ½ || 4½ || 20.25 || 2796
|-
| 6 || align=left |  || 2771
| ½ || 0 || 0 || ½ || ½ ||  || 1 || 1 || ½ || ½ || 4½ || 19.25 || 2800
|-
| 7 || align=left |  || 2796
| ½ || 0 || 1 || ½ || ½ || 0 ||  || ½ || ½ || ½ || 4 || 18.25 || 2759
|-
| 8 || align=left |  || 2786
| ½ || ½ || 0 || 1 || ½ || 0 || ½ ||  || ½ || ½ || 4 || 18.00 || 2760
|-
| 9 || align=left |  || 2832
| 0 || ½ || 0 || ½ || ½ || ½ || ½ || ½ ||  || 1 || 4 || 16.75 || 2755
|-
| 10 || align=left |  || 2781
| 0 || ½ || ½ || ½ || ½ || ½ || ½ || ½ || 0 ||  || 3½ || || 2721
|}

2018

Blitz tournament
The blitz tournament was played on 27 May 2018. The winner of the blitz tournament chose his number in the main tournament. Number 2 got the highest available number, and number 3 the second highest, and so on.
{| class="wikitable" style="text-align:center;"
|+6th Altibox Norway Chess Blitz, 27 May 2018, Stavanger, Norway
!  !! Player !! Blitz rating !! 1 !! 2 !! 3 !! 4 !! 5 !! 6 !! 7 !! 8 !! 9 !! 10 !! Points !! SB
|-
| 1 || align=left | || 2824
|  || ½ || ½ || 0 || 1 || ½ || 1 || 1 || ½ || 1 || 6 || 
|-
| 2 || align=left |  || 2869
| ½ ||  || ½ || ½ || ½ || ½ || ½ || 1 || 1 || ½ || 5½ || 23.00
|-
| 3 || align=left |  || 2784
| ½ || ½ ||  || ½ || ½ || 1 || 0 || ½ || 1 || 1 || 5½ || 22.75
|-
| 4 || align=left |  || 2965
| 1 || ½ || ½ ||  || ½ || ½ || 1 || ½ || 0 || ½ || 5 || 
|-
| 5 || align=left |  || 2730
| 0 || ½ || ½ || ½ ||  || 1 || 1 || 0 || 0 || 1 || 4½ || 20.00
|-
| 6 || align=left |  || 2839
| ½ || ½ || 0 || ½ || 0 ||  || 1 || ½ || 1 || ½ || 4½ || 19.00
|-
| 7 || align=left |  || 2814
| 0 || ½ || 1 || 0 || 0 || 0 ||  || 1 || 1 || 1 || 4½ || 17.75
|-
| 8 || align=left |  || 2838
| 0 || 0 || ½ || ½ || 1 || ½ || 0 ||  || 1 || 0 || 3½ || 
|-
| 9 || align=left |  || 2843
| ½ || 0 || 0 || 1 || 1 || 0 || 0 || 0 ||  || ½ || 3 || 14.00
|-
| 10 || align=left |  || 2793
| 0 || ½ || 0 || ½ || 0 || ½ || 0 || 1 || ½ ||  || 3 || 12.50
|}

Classical tournament
{| class="wikitable" style="text-align: center;"
|+6th Altibox Norway Chess, 28 May – 7 June 2018, Stavanger, Norway, Category XXII (2791)
! !! Player !! Rating !! 1 !! 2 !! 3 !! 4 !! 5 !! 6 !! 7 !! 8 !! 9 !! 10 !! Points !! SB !! TPR
|-
|-style="background:#ccffcc;"
| 1 || align=left| || 2822 
|   || 0 || ½ || 1 || 1 || ½ || ½ || ½ || 1 || – || 5 ||  || 2882
|-
| 2 || align="left" | || 2843 
| 1 ||  || ½ || ½ || 0 || 1 || ½ || ½ || ½ || – || 4½ || 18.25 || 2827
|-
| 3 || align="left" | || 2769 
| ½ || ½ ||  || ½ || ½ || ½ || ½ || ½ || 1 || ½ || 4½ || 17.25 || 2836
|-
| 4 || align="left" | || 2760 
| 0 || ½ || ½ ||  || ½ || ½ || ½ || 1 || 1 || ½ || 4½ || 16.25 || 2837
|-
| 5 || align="left" | || 2778  
| 0 || 1 || ½ || ½ ||  || ½ || ½ || ½ || ½ || – || 4 || 15.75 || 2792
|-|| 
| 6 || align="left" | || 2764 
| ½ || 0 || ½ || ½ || ½ ||  || 1 || ½ || ½ || – || 4 || 15.50 || 2794
|-
| 7 || align="left" | || 2808 
| ½ || ½ || ½ || ½ || ½ || 0 ||  || ½ || ½ || – || 3½ || || 2746
|-
| 8 || align="left" | || 2789 
| ½ || ½ || ½ || 0 || ½ || ½ || ½ ||  || 0 || ½ || 3 || 12.75 || 2711
|-
| 9 || align="left" | || 2782
| 0 || ½ || 0 || 0 || ½ || ½ || ½ || 1 ||  || – || 3 || 11.00 || 2705
|-
|  || align="left" | || 2791 
| – || – || ½ || ½ || – || – || – || ½ || – ||  ||  || || 2773
|}

On 31 May 2018, Ding Liren fractured his hip bone in a bicycle accident and underwent surgery the next morning. It was announced on 2 June that Ding had withdrawn from the tournament. Due to him having played less than half the rounds, the three draws (against Nakamura, Vachier-Lagrave and Anand) that he had played in rounds 1–3 were discounted for tournament purposes, and counted only for rating purposes.

2019

Blitz tournament 

{| class="wikitable" style="text-align:center;"
|+7th Altibox Norway Chess Blitz, 3 June 2019, Stavanger, Norway
!  !! Player !! Blitz rating !! 1 !! 2 !! 3 !! 4 !! 5 !! 6 !! 7 !! 8 !! 9 !! 10 !! Points !! SB !! Wins !! TPR
|-
| 1 || align=left |  || 2921
|  || 1 || 1 || 1 || 1 || 1 || 1 || 0 || ½ || 1 || 7½ || || || 3057
|-
| 2 || align=left |  || 2827
| 0 ||  || 1 || ½ || ½ || 1 || 1 || ½ || ½ || 1 || 6 || 23.75 || || 2912
|-
| 3 || align=left |  || 2923
| 0 || 0 ||  || 1 || ½ || 1 || ½ || 1 || 1 || 1 || 6 || 21.50 || || 2899
|-
| 4 || align=left |  || 2757
| 0 || ½ || 0 ||  || 0 || 1 || 1 || 1 || ½ || 1 || 5 || || || 2828
|-
| 5 || align=left |  || 2773
| 0 || ½ || ½ || 1 ||  || 0 || 1 || ½ || ½ || ½ || 4½ || || || 2781
|-
| 6 || align=left |  || 2705
| 0 || 0 || 0 || 0 || 1 ||  || ½ || 1 || 1 || 0 || 3½ || 12.25 || 3 || 2709
|-
| 7 || align=left |  || 2759
| 0 || 0 || ½ || 0 || 0 || ½ ||  || 1 || ½ || 1 || 3½ || 12.25 || 2 || 2707
|-
| 8 || align=left |  || 2804
| 1 || ½ || 0 || 0 || ½ || 0 || 0 ||  || 1 || 0 || 3 || 15.75 || || 2655
|-
| 9 || align=left |  || 2747
| ½ || ½ || 0 || ½ || ½ || 0 || ½ || 0 ||  || ½ || 3 || 14.75 || || 2661
|-
| 10 || align=left |  || 2750
| 0 || 0 || 0 || 0 || ½ || 1 || 0 || 1 || ½ ||  || 3 || 10.25 || || 2660
|}

Classical tournament
The tournament regulations for the classical tournament were different than other tournaments. Players were awarded 2 points for a win, and 0 points for a loss. In the case of draws, the players would move on to an Armageddon game, with 10 minutes for White and 7 minutes for Black, with Black having draw odds. Players were awarded 1½ points for a draw and an Armageddon win, and ½ points for a draw and an Armageddon loss.

{| class="wikitable" style="text-align: center;"
|+7th Altibox Norway Chess, 4–15 June 2019, Stavanger, Norway, Category XXII (2784)
! !! Player !! Rating !! 1 !! 2 !! 3 !! 4 !! 5 !! 6 !! 7 !! 8 !! 9 !! 10 !! Points !! SB !! TPR
|-
| style="background:#ccffcc;" |1 || style="background:#ccffcc;" align=left| || style="background:#ccffcc;" | 2875
|  || style="background: black; color: white" | 1½  ||2 ||style="background: black; color: white" | ½ ||style="background: black; color: white"|1½ ||1½ || 1½ ||style="background: black; color: white" | 1½ || 1½ || 2 || style="background:#ccffcc;" | 13½ || style="background:#ccffcc;" | || style="background:#ccffcc;" | 2854
|-
| 2 || align="left" | || 2752 || ½ ||   ||style="background: black; color: white" | 1½  ||0  ||1½  ||style="background: black; color: white" | 1½  ||style="background: black; color: white" | 1½  ||½  || style="background: black; color: white" |2 || 1½ || 10½ || 48.00 || 2787
|-
| 3 || align="left" | || 2738 ||style="background: black; color: white" |0 || ½ ||   ||1½  ||style="background: black; color: white" |0  ||1½  ||style="background: black; color: white" |1½  ||style="background: black; color: white" |1½  ||2 ||style="background: black; color: white" |2 || 10½ || 45.50 || 2789
|-
| 4 || align="left" | || 2819 ||1½  ||style="background: black; color: white" |2 ||style="background: black; color: white" |½ ||   ||½  ||style="background: black; color: white" |0  ||1½  ||2  ||style="background: black; color: white" |½ ||style="background: black; color: white" |1½ || 10 || 45.50 || 2823
|-
| 5 || align="left" | || 2754 ||½  ||style="background: black; color: white" |½  ||2 ||style="background: black; color: white" |1½ ||   ||style="background: black; color: white" |½  ||½  ||1½  ||style="background: black; color: white" |1½ ||style="background: black; color: white" |1½ || 10 || 39.50 || 2830
|-|| 
| 6 || align="left" | || 2805 ||style="background: black; color: white" |½  ||½  ||style="background: black; color: white" |½  ||2 ||1½ ||   ||style="background: black; color: white" |½  ||style="background: black; color: white" |½  ||2 ||½ || 8½ ||  || 2861
|-
| 7 || align="left" | || 2767 ||style="background: black; color: white" |½  ||½  ||½  ||style="background: black; color: white" |½  ||style="background: black; color: white" |1½ ||1½ ||   ||style="background: black; color: white" |1½  ||0 ||style="background: black; color: white" |1½ || 8 || 32.00 || 2743
|-
| 8 || align="left" | || 2779 ||½  ||style="background: black; color: white" |1½  ||½  ||style="background: black; color: white" |0  ||style="background: black; color: white" |½  ||1½ ||½ || ||style="background: black; color: white" |1½ ||1½ || 8 || 30.00 || 2741
|-
| 9 || align="left" | || 2774 ||style="background: black; color: white" |½  ||0  ||style="background: black; color: white" |0  ||1½  ||½  ||style="background: black; color: white" |0  ||style="background: black; color: white" |2 ||½ || ||½ || 5½ || 18.00 || 2705
|-
| 10 || align="left" | || 2775 ||style="background: black; color: white" |0  ||style="background: black; color: white" |½  ||0  ||½  ||½  ||style="background: black; color: white" |1½  ||½  ||style="background: black; color: white" |½ ||style="background: black; color: white" |1½ || || 5½ || 14.00 || 2705
|}

2020 
The performance rating is based on classical games only. As with 2019, an Armageddon game was to follow if the main classical game ended in a draw. The points system was altered to award 3 points for a win, 0 points for a loss, 1½ for a draw and an Armageddon win and 1 for a draw and an Armageddon loss.
{| class="wikitable" style="text-align: center;"
|+8th Altibox Norway Chess, 5–16 October 2020, Stavanger, Norway, Category XXI (2763)
! !! Player !! Rating !! 1 !! 2 !! 3 !! 4 !! 5 !! 6 !! Points !! TPR
|-
|-style="background:#ccffcc;"
| 1 || align=left| || 2863 || || 1½ 3 || 1½ 0 || 3 1½ || 0 3 || 3 3 || 19½ || 2853
|-
| 2 || align="left" | || 2728 || 1 0 ||  || 1½ 1½ || 1½ 1 || 3 3 || 3 3 || 18½ || 2880
|-
| 3 || align="left" | || 2767 || 1 3 || 1 1 ||  || 3 0 || 3 1 || 3 1½ || 17½ || 2872
|-
| 4 || align="left" | || 2828 || 0 1 || 1 1½ || 0 3 ||  || 3 1½ || 3 1½ || 15½ || 2786
|-
| 5 || align="left" | || 2757 || 3 0 || 0 0 || 0 1½ || 0 1 ||  || 1 3 || 9½ || 2654
|-|| 
| 6 || align="left" | || 2633 || 0 0 || 0 0 || 0 1 || 0 1 || 1½ 0 ||  || 3½ || 2493
|}

2021 
{| class="wikitable" style="text-align: center;"
|+9th Altibox Norway Chess, 7–18 September 2021, Stavanger, Norway, Category XXI (2760) 
|-
! !! Player !! Rating !! 1 !! 2 !! 3 !! 4 !! 5 !! 6 !! Points !! TPR
|-style="background:#ccffcc;"
| 1 || align=left| || 2855 || || 1½ 3 || 1½ 3|| 1½ 1½ 
| 0 3 || 1½ 3 || 19½|| 2852
|-
| 2 || align="left" | || 2754 || 1 0 ||  || 0 3 || 1 3 || 1 3 || 3 3 || 18|| 2874
|-
| 3 || align="left" | || 2760 || 1 0|| 3 0 ||  
| 1 1 || 1½ 3 || 3 3|| 16½|| 2834
|-
| 4 || align="left" | || 2792 || 1 1 || 1½ 0 || 1½ 1½ ||  || 3 1 || 1½ 0
| 12|| 2717
|-
| 5 || align="left" | || 2758 || 3 0 || 1½ 0|| 1 0 || 0 1½ ||  
| 1½ 1½ || 10|| 2649
|-|| 
| 6 || align="left" | || 2642 || 1 0 || 0 0 
| 0 0 || 1 3 || 1 1 ||  || 7|| 2634
|}

2022

Blitz tournament

{| class="wikitable" style="text-align: center;"
|+10th Altibox Norway Chess Blitz, May 30, 2022, Stavanger, Norway
|-
! !! Player !! Rating !! 1 !! 2 !! 3 !! 4 !! 5 !! 6 !! 7 !! 8 !! 9 !! 10 !! Points !! SB !! H2H !! Wins 
|-
| 1 || align=left|  || 2814 ||  || 1 || ½ || ½ || ½ || 1 || 1 || 1 || 0 || 1 || 6½ || || ||
|-
| 2 || align="left" |  || 2832 || 0 ||  || ½ || 0 || ½ || 1 || 1 || 1 || 1 || ½ || 5½ || || ||
|-
| 3 || align="left" |  || 2766 || ½ || ½ ||  || 1 || ½ || ½ || 0 || 1 || 1 || 0 || 5 || 22.25 || 1 ||
|-
| 4 || align="left" |  || 2758 || ½ || 1 || 0 ||  || ½ || 1 || 0 || 1 || ½ || ½ || 5 || 22.25 || 0 ||
|-
| 5 || align="left" |  || 2778 || ½ || ½ || ½ || ½ ||  || 0 || 1 || 1 || ½ || ½ || 5 || 21.50 || ||
|-
| 6 || align="left" |  || 2567 || 0 || 0 || ½ || 0 || 1 ||  || 1 || 0 || 1 || 1 || 4½ || || ||
|-
| 7 || align="left" |  || 2813 || 0 || 0 || 1 || 1 || 0 || 0 ||  || 0 || 1 || 1 || 4 || || ||
|- 
| 8 || align="left" |  || 2667 || 0 || 0 || 0 || 0 || 0 || 1 || 1 ||  || 1 || ½ || 3½ || || ||
|-
| 9 || align="left" |  || 2712 || 1 || 0 || 0 || ½ || ½ || 0 || 0 || 0 ||  || 1 || 3 || 14.50 || 1 ||
|-
| 10 || align="left" |  || 2705 || 0 || ½ || 1 || ½ || ½ || 0 || 0 || ½ || 0 ||  || 3 || 14.50 || 0 ||
|}

Classical tournament
Seeding was based on a blitz tournament played before the classical event. A classical win was worth 3 points and a loss 0 points. If the classical game was drawn, an armageddon game was played, with the same colours as the classical game. The player who won the armageddon game received 1½ points and the loser 1 point.

{| class="wikitable" style="text-align: center;"
|+10th Altibox Norway Chess, May 31 – 11 June 2022, Stavanger, Norway, Category XXI (2754)
|-
! !! Player !! Rating !! 1 !! 2 !! 3 !! 4 !! 5 !! 6 !! 7 !! 8 !! 9 !! 10 !! Points !! SB !! TPR
|- style="background:#cfc;"
| 1 || align=left|  || 2864 ||  || 3 || 1 || 1½ || 1 || 3 || 1½ || 1 || 3 || 1½ || 16½ || || 2865
|-
| 2 || align="left" |  || 2770 || 0 ||  || 3 || 1 || 1½ || 3 || 1½ || 1½ || 1 || 3 || 15½ || || 2833
|-
| 3 || align="left" |  || 2751 || 1½ || 0 ||  || 3 || 1 || 1½ || 3 || 1½ || 1½ || 1½ || 14½ || || 2794
|-
| 4 || align="left" |  || 2750 || 1 || 1½ || 0 ||  || 3 || 1½ || 1½ || 3 || 1 || 1½ || 14 || || 2794
|-
| 5 || align="left" |  || 2766 || 1½ || 1 || 1½ || 0 ||  || 1½ || 1 || 1½ || 3 || 1½ || 12½ || || 2752
|-
| 6 || align="left" |  || 2761 || 0 || 0 || 1 || 1 || 1 ||  || 1½ || 3 || 3 || 1½ || 12 || || 2753
|- 
| 7 || align="left" |  || 2730 || 1 || 1 || 0 || 1 || 1½ || 1 ||  || 1½ || 1½ || 1 || 9½ || || 2717
|- 
| 8 || align="left" |  || 2654 || 1½ || 1 || 1 || 0 || 1 || 0 || 1 ||  || 1 || 3 || 9½ || || 2725
|- 
| 9 || align="left" |  || 2753 || 0 || 1½ || 1 || 1½ || 0 || 0 || 1 || 1½ ||  || 1½ || 8 || || 2630
|-
| 10 || align="left" |  || 2744 || 1 || 0 || 1 || 1 || 1 || 1 || 1½ || 0 || 1 ||  || 7½ || || 2631
|}

References

External links 
 

Chess competitions
Chess in Norway
Sport in Stavanger
International sports competitions hosted by Norway
Recurring sporting events established in 2013
2013 establishments in Norway